The 1958–59 Montreal Canadiens season was the club's 50th season of play. The Canadiens won the Stanley Cup for the fourth consecutive season, and the 11th time in club history.

Regular season

Final standings

Record vs. opponents

Schedule and results

Playoffs

Stanley Cup finals

Rocket Richard, hampered by injuries, did not score at all during the playoffs. Toronto was making its first finals appearance since 1951.

Toronto Maple Leafs vs. Montreal Canadiens

Montreal wins best-of-seven series 4 games to 1.

Player statistics

Regular season
Scoring

Goaltending

Playoffs
Scoring

Goaltending

Awards and records

Transactions

See also
 1958–59 NHL season
 List of Stanley Cup champions

References
Canadiens on Hockey Database
Canadiens on NHL Reference

Stanley Cup championship seasons
Montreal Canadiens seasons
Mon
Mon